Ardi (also Romanized as Ārdī) is a village in Kalkharan Rural District, in the Central District of Ardabil County, Ardabil Province, Iran. At the 2006 census, its population was 216, in 54 families.

References 

Towns and villages in Ardabil County